Elf is a racing yacht built in 1888 by George Lawley & Son of South Boston, Massachusetts, for William H. Wilkinson. She was designed by George F. Lawley and is the oldest small yacht in the United States. She is located at the Chesapeake Bay Maritime Museum in St. Michaels, MD.Talbot County, Maryland.

She was listed on the National Register of Historic Places on March 26, 1980.

References

External links
 Classic Yacht Restoration Guild - About Elf
, including undated photo, at Maryland Historical Trust

1888 ships
Cecil County, Maryland
Individual sailing vessels
Ships on the National Register of Historic Places in Maryland
National Register of Historic Places in Cecil County, Maryland